The Baywalk is a popular seaside promenade and beachfront overlooking Manila Bay along Roxas Boulevard in the Manila, Philippines. The Baywalk is a two-kilometre stretch from the US Embassy near Rizal Park up to the Cultural Center of the Philippines just past the Manila Yacht Club. It is a popular venue at night with open-air cafés that serve local cuisine while onlookers may watch the Manila sunset. Many of the venues also feature music and live band performances. Local artists frequent the area and free mime, acrobatics, and other art performances can sometimes be found along the strip. Several statues of national figures and other notable people can be found in the Baywalk.

History

The Baywalk was greatly improved during the administration of Manila City Mayor Lito Atienza as part of his flagship program "Buhayin ang Maynila" (English: Revitalize Manila).

When Mayor Alfredo Lim took office in 2007, he removed the establishments along Baywalk with the reason that they block the sunset. Since then, vagrants have occupied the area and the once vibrant seaside promenade was gone. Afterwards, the national government undertook a rehabilitation of the Baywalk after it was destroyed by storm surges.

In 2020, a beach, called Manila Baywalk Dolomite Beach, was constructed along the shores of the Baywalk. The program for creating the artificial beach was launched in January 2019 under the management of Secretary of Environment and Natural Resources Roy Cimatu.

See also
Manila Bay Beach
Manila Bay
Manila
Bay City, Metro Manila

References

External links

http://www.philippines-travel-guide.com/manila-baywalk.html
http://www.tripadvisor.com/Attraction_Review-g298573-d556733-Reviews-Baywalk-Manila_National_Capital_Region_Luzon.html

Tourist attractions in Manila
Parks in Manila
Redeveloped ports and waterfronts in the Philippines
Buildings and structures in Malate, Manila
Manila Bay